W. Edward Goodall (Eddie Goodall) is a former North Carolina state senator and former director of the NC Public Charter Schools Association. Goodall, a Republican, served in the North Carolina Senate from 2005 to 2011 for District 35, consisting of Mecklenburg Country and  Union County.

References 

Year of birth missing (living people)
Living people
North Carolina Republicans